Puerto Vallarta, in the Mexican state of Jalisco, has an extensive public art collection. Works include:

 Ándale Bernardo by Jim Demetro, Lázaro Cárdenas Park
 The Boy on the Seahorse by Rafael Zamarripa
 Erizados by Maritza Vazquez, Malecón
 The Fish Sellers' Mosaic by Manuel Lepe
 The Fisherman by Ramiz Barquet, Centro and Zona Romántica
 The Fishermen by Jim and Christina Demetro, Zona Romántica
 Friendship Fountain by James "Bud" Bottoms and Octavio González, Malecón
 The Good Fortune Unicorn by Anibal Riebeling, Malecón
 Identidad (2019) by Marta Gilbert
 In Search of Reason by Sergio Bustamante, Malecón
 Monumento de la Dama Desnuda
 Nature as Mother by Adrián Reynoso, Malecón
 Nostalgia by Ramiz Barquet, Malecón
 Millennium by Mathis Lidice, Malecón
 Origin and Destination by Pedro Tello, Malecón
 Rain by Jovian. Malecón
 The Rotunda by the Sea by Alejandro Colunga, Malecón
 Statue of Ignacio Vallarta, Plaza de Armas
 Statue of John Huston, Isla Cuale
 Statue of Lázaro Cárdenas, Lázaro Cárdenas Park
 Statue of Lorena Ochoa, Marina Vallarta Golf Club
 Statue of Miguel Hidalgo y Costilla, Plaza Hidalgo
 Statue of Paschal Baylón, Malecón
 The Subtle Stone Eater by Jonás Gutiérrez, Malecón
 Tritón y Sirena by Carlos Espino, Malecón
 Vallarta Dancers by Jim Demetro, Malecón
 The Washer Woman by Jim Demetro, Malecón

References

Puerto Vallarta
Puerto Vallarta
Puerto Vallarta
public art
public art